Dale B. McTavish (born February 28, 1972) is a Canadian former professional ice hockey player who played nine games in the National Hockey League for the Calgary Flames in 1996–97, recording one goal and two assists.

Playing career
McTavish was born in Eganville, Ontario. He played four seasons of junior hockey with the Peterborough Petes of the Ontario Hockey League. He helped lead the Petes to the league championship in 1992–93, and a Memorial Cup berth. Undrafted, McTavish spent two years playing Canadian college hockey with the St. Francis Xavier X-Men before attracting the attention of NHL scouts. McTavish signed a contract with the Flames in 1996, but spent most of the next two seasons in the minors with the Saint John Flames.

McTavish continued his career in Europe in 1997, playing three seasons in the Finnish SM-liiga with SaiPa and the Espoo Blues. With SaiPa he reached SM-liiga semi-finals and was by far the most popular player within SaiPa supporters. In 2000, he moved to Switzerland, where he played for eight seasons: first with Rapperswil-Jona Lakers where he spent five seasons (2000-2005), then for ZSC Lions from 2006-07, and finally EV Zug in 2007-08. For the season 2010-2011 McTavish returned to SaiPa, where his European career started. After that season he retired.

McTavish was a member of Team Canada at the 2007 Spengler Cup.

In 1995, McTavish also played for the New Jersey Rockin' Rollers inline hockey club of the Roller Hockey International, where he recorded two goals and three assists in six games.

Pembroke Lumber Kings
The previous owner of the Pembroke Lumber Kings, Sheldon Keefe, announced over Twitter on May 29, 2013 that he had sold the Pembroke Lumber Kings to Dale McTavish.

Personal life
His son, Mason McTavish, was selected 3rd overall in the 2021 NHL Entry Draft by the Anaheim Ducks.

Career statistics

References

External links

1972 births
Calgary Flames players
Canadian ice hockey centres
Espoo Blues players
EV Zug players
HC Sierre players
Ice hockey people from Ontario
Living people
New Jersey Rockin' Rollers players
People from Renfrew County
Peterborough Petes (ice hockey) players
SC Rapperswil-Jona Lakers players
St. Francis Xavier X-Men ice hockey players
Saint John Flames players
SaiPa players
Undrafted National Hockey League players
ZSC Lions players
Canadian expatriate ice hockey players in Finland
Canadian expatriate ice hockey players in Switzerland